Trustmark is an employee benefits company. According to Crain's Chicago Business magazine, Trustmark ranks #69 among Chicago's Largest Privately Held Companies in 2018.

History 
Trustmark was founded in 1913 as the Brotherhood of All Railway Employees, and later in 1917 adopted the name Benefit Association of Railway Employees. In 1963 the company became Benefit Trust Life Insurance Company. Only in 1994 was the name "Trustmark Insurance Company" adopted, upon merger with Bankers Mutual Life of Freeport.

By 1998 Trustmark had assets of 1.8 billion dollars. In 2010 the company purchased Health Fitness Corporation of Bloomington, Minnesota to expand their offerings into consumer health programs that encourage workers to stay fit and healthy. In 2012 United States Secretary of Health and Human Services Kathleen Sebelius ordered the company to rescind its rate hike increases under powers granted by the Affordable Care Act; describing them as "excessive rate increases that would raise rates at least thirteen percent for customers in Alabama, Arizona, Pennsylvania, Virginia, and Wyoming". This was the second time in the history of the United States that this power was used since the act was passed in 2010.

Kevin Slawin becomes President and CEO of Trustmark in 2018. David D. Weick has served as Chairman of the Board since 2015.

Subsidiaries
Trustmark Voluntary Benefit Solutions offers employee benefits, including life, disability, accident and critical illness insurance, designed specifically for the voluntary market. Products are distributed at the worksite through national and regional brokers and professional benefit communication firms.
CoreSource provides benefit administration and health management services to a broad range of clients including self-funded employers, state high-risk pools, public retiree plans and fully insured medical blocks.
Trustmark Employer Medical focuses on employer-sponsored health benefit solutions for smaller employers. In addition to health plan coverage, Employer Medical offers foreign student insurance and an array of ancillary coverage. Star Marketing and Administration, Inc (Starmark) administers PPO-based fully insured and self-funded plans to small businesses and their employees. And Trustmark Life Insurance Company insures the fully insured plans and provides stop-loss insurance for the self-funded plans.
HealthFitness is an NCQA- and URAC-accredited provider of integrated population health management, condition management, wellness and health advocacy solutions targeted to midsize and larger employers (including Fortune 500 companies), and health plans. HealthFitness focuses on behavior change to generate measurable results.

Community outreach
In 1990 the company began a longterm multi-year commitment to fund science and health education initiatives to public and private school for 7th grade students throughout Lake County, Illinois in partnership with Lake Forest Hospital. This included providing students with cow and pig hearts for dissection in science lab classes. The program has since expanded to provide annual grants to schools and educators, and distribute funds to community organizations involved in healthcare initiatives. In 2009 the company distributed $1.21 million to community non-profit organizations involved in healthcare initiatives, and in 2010 the company gave $80,000.00 in grants to school teachers.
.

References

External links
Trustmark website

Financial services companies established in 1913
Financial services companies of the United States
1913 establishments in the United States
Companies based in Lake Forest, Illinois
Mutual companies of the United States